Francisco José Orlich Bolmarcich (10 March 190729 October 1969) was the 34th President of Costa Rica from 1962 to 1966. 
He was an ethnic Croat, a descendant of Croatian settlers from the town Punat on the island of Krk, Croatia. His villa in Punat is named "Villa Costarica".

Together with his brothers he founded in 1928 FJ Orlich & Hnos Ltda.  (FJ Orlich & Brothers Limited). At first a large supply store in his hometown of San Ramón, this eventually grew to become one of Costa Rica's largest coffee firms.  His half-brother, Franjo Jozef Orlich, the namesake of the firm, moved from Costa Rica to Pennsylvania and worked for Bethlehem Steel as a Pattern Maker in the Castings Plant.

A long-time friend of José Figueres Ferrer, with whom he had traveled together to study in the United States, Orlich was Figueres' second in command within the National Liberation Army in the Costa Rican Civil War.

Following that, the National Liberation Party was founded in the Orlich family farm in La Paz, San Ramón.

He twice served as Public Works Minister (1948–1949, 1953–1957) in Figueres' cabinets. Afterwards he ran for president in 1958, but lost to Mario Echandi Jiménez.  He ran again in 1962, against the defeated 1948 leader Dr Rafael Ángel Calderón Guardia, and won the presidency.

Always called by his countrymen 'Don Chico', during his presidency he faced the major eruption of the Irazú volcano, that started just as U.S. President John F. Kennedy was visiting Costa Rica and lasted for over a year, causing major agricultural damage and landslides in the city of Cartago.

Don Chico left the presidency as a well loved figure and died of a stroke three years later.

He died on 29 October 1969 in San José. His wife, Marita Camacho Quirós, who is (as of ) , thus being the longest living person in Costa Rica and the oldest former First Lady in the world.

References

1907 births
1969 deaths
People from San Ramón, Costa Rica
Costa Rican people of Croatian descent
National Liberation Party (Costa Rica) politicians
Presidents of Costa Rica
Businesspeople in coffee